NCTA – The Internet & Television Association (formerly the National Cable & Telecommunications Association, and commonly known as the NCTA) is the principal trade association for the U.S. broadband and pay television industries. It represents more than 90% of the U.S. cable market, more than 200 cable networks, and equipment suppliers and providers of other services to the cable industry.

The NCTA is one of the largest political lobbying organizations in the United States and has been a vocal opponent of net neutrality and municipal broadband.

History

NCTA was first organized as the National Community Television Council in September 1951, when a small group of community antenna (CATV) operators met at a hotel in Pottsville, Pennsylvania. They gathered in response to concern over the Internal Revenue Service's attempts to impose an 8% excise tax on their operations. These business people quickly became aware of other common interests, which led to a series of organizational meetings during September and October 1951 and January 1952. In January 1952, the organization's name officially changed to National Community Television Association.

NCTA's growth kept pace with the rapidly expanding CATV industry. Within its first year, nearly 40 CATV systems joined the organization. Membership grew into the hundreds by the end of the 1950s and thousands by the end of the 1960s. In the 1960s, the term "Community Antenna Television (CATV)" gave way to the term "cable", reflecting the industry's expanded categories of service – including local news, weather information, and channels of pay television. Accordingly, in 1968, NCTA – while retaining its acronym – changed its official name for the first time, to National Cable Television Association.

Following the introduction of global telecommunication satellites, the late 1970s and 1980s saw initial explosive growth in cable content, as entrepreneurs gave birth to such networks as CNN, ESPN, MTV, BET, TBS, USA, Discovery, Lifetime, C-SPAN, and eventually hundreds of other channels.  During this period, virtually all of the nation's major programming services also joined NCTA, providing a new dimension to the organization's representation of cable interests in Washington.

To reflect the increased role of cable internet and other forms of two-way communication in the industry, the organization changed its name to the National Cable and Telecommunications Association in April 2001. On September 19, 2016, NCTA changed its name once more, to NCTA – The Internet & Television Association. The new name maintains the NCTA acronym, but intentionally removes the reference to cable in order to reflect the organization's increased scope, stating that the change was "a continuation of the association's effort to reflect how the marketplace is no longer defined by silos of the past". The organization had already begun moving towards downplaying cable with the re-branding of its annual convention, The Cable Show, as INTX in 2015.

Leadership
NCTA is governed by a board of directors.  As of March 2012, the chairman of the board of directors was Patrick Esser, president of Cox Communications.

The current president and CEO of NCTA is Michael Powell, former head of the FCC, who replaced Kyle McSlarrow on April 25, 2011. McSlarrow left for Comcast.

Lobbying
The NCTA is one of the largest lobbying organizations in the United States, spending about $12.0 million on political lobbying in the year 2014.

The NCTA opposed the FCC's move to broaden the definition of multichannel video programming distributors to allow over-the-top internet based services to qualify but added that if the definition of MVPDs was broadened, it should hold internet delivery to the same obligations as traditional cable services. NCTA President Michael Powell opposes reforming the Telecommunications Act of 1996 to allow for a la carte pay television, as it would impact smaller niche networks.

In March 2014, the NCTA supported the FCC's decision to open up the 100 MHz of spectrum for unlicensed Wi-Fi services.

Internet issues
The NCTA has been vocal on issues regarding net neutrality; in particular, they have objected to the classification of internet service as a common carrier under title II of the 1996 Telecommunications Act. In 2010, the NCTA urged the FCC not to codify its Net Neutrality rules. In 2014, after the 2010 rules were thrown out in court, the NCTA ran ads in news media opposing reclassifying as a common carrier. In 2014, ProPublica reported that NCTA were privately behind the "Onward Internet" campaign, which advocates an internet as free from rules. In 2016, the NCTA and the American Cable Association submitted en banc petitions seeking a review of a ruling that upheld the net neutrality rules, arguing that cable internet systems should not be regulated in the same manner as "archaic telephone systems".

The NCTA was a supporter of the Stop Online Piracy Act of 2011, saying it gave copyright owners reasonable tools to protect their property. The NCTA opposed the FCC's decision to raise the minimum internet speed for Connect America Fund broadband subsidies from 4Mbit/s to 10Mbit/s, claiming 4mbits was satisfactory.

Following a model bill devised by the American Legislative Exchange Council (ALEC), the NCTA has advocated for legislation prohibiting or restricting municipal broadband in many states. When Barack Obama asked the FCC to pre-empt these laws in January 2015, NCTA defended the legislation, saying municipal projects are often costly failures.

NCTA president Michael Powell has advocated for internet service providers to increase their use of data caps on internet use, aiming not to reduce congestion, but to promote fairness.

Events and subsidiaries

INTX
NCTA held an annual conference known as INTX: The Internet and Television Expo (formerly The Cable Show until 2015), which was the largest annual trade show for the cable and broadband industry in the United States. INTX featured discussions with current and former FCC commissioners, including remarks from the sitting chair of the FCC in 2010, 2011, 2012, 2013, and 2014.

INTX also features the presentation of the organization's Vanguard Awards, which are nominated by the NCTA membership and selected by a committee composed of members from the NCTA Board of Directors as well as former award winners.

In September 2016, the NCTA announced that INTX would no longer be held. President and CEO Michael Powell stated that the trade shows were an "anachronism," and that "contemporary venues emphasize conversation, dialog, and more intimate opportunities to explore and interact with technology." Variety noted that its attendance had been declining, as the ongoing consolidation in the cable industry negated the need for such a trade show.

CableACE Awards

From 1978 through 1997, NCTA sponsored the CableACE Award to honor excellence in American cable television programming. It was a counterpart to the Emmy which previously did not recognize cable programming. The awards were discontinued after 1997, as the Emmys included cable television programming.

Cable in the Classroom

The association also provides management oversight of Cable in the Classroom — the cable industry's education foundation.

Walter Kaitz Foundation

NCTA provides management and oversight to the Walter Kaitz Foundation — which promotes diversity in cable's workforce, supplier chain, content, and marketing.

See also
 CTIA – The Wireless Association
 National Cable & Telecommunications Ass'n v. Brand X Internet Services

References

External links
Official website

1952 establishments in the United States
Television organizations in the United States
Trade associations based in the United States
Lobbying organizations based in Washington, D.C.